Awkin (Quechua awki prince; a mythical figure of the Andean culture; grandfather, -n a suffix, Hispanicized spelling Auquin) is a  mountain in the Andes of Peru. It is located in the Lima Region, Cajatambo Province, on the border of the districts of Cajatambo and Gorgor, and in the Oyón Province, Oyón District.

References

Mountains of Peru
Mountains of Lima Region